Special Kindness In Packages, Inc. (also known as SKIP or SKIP Cares) was a U.S. 501(c)(3) charitable nonprofit corporation that provided free and fun care packages to U.S. military personnel deployed overseas.

History 
In 2004 SKIP was founded by Tracy Stiers to honor her brother, U.S. Army Sgt(ret.) Skip Spoerke, who had deployed to Iraq.

The organization started out small, sending a handful of care packages to Spoerke and his friends each month, and developed to accommodate the growing requests for care packages coming in. By the time Spoerke returned home in February 2006, SKIP was sending upwards of 75 care packages every month to deployed troops around the world. At its peak, SKIP shipped more than 1,500 care packages to deployed soldiers, sailors, airmen, and marines each year.

On December 31, 2011, SKIP ended its mission of sending care packages.

Military care packages 
 

SKIP's Care Packages For Soldiers, Sailors, Airmen, and Marines were among the most requested care packages by deployed US military members around the world.

Care packages shipped by SKIP were free for deployed troops.

SKIP care package contents 
 Books
 DVDs
 CDs
 iTunes (or similar) gift cards
 Card Games and Playing Cards
 Small toys
 Puzzles
 Cards/Letters from home
 Candy
 Popcorn/Peanuts
 Water Guns (summer seasonal)

References 

 PRlog.org - SKIP Leadership Changes Hands
 Guidestar Nonprofit Report: Special Kindness in Packages, Inc.

United States military support organizations
501(c)(3) organizations